Jonah Kūhiō Kalanianaʻole (March 26, 1871 – January 7, 1922) was a prince of the Kingdom of Hawaiʻi until it was overthrown by a coalition of American and European businessmen in 1893. He later went on to become a representative in the Territory of Hawaii as delegate to the United States Congress, and as such is the only member of Congress ever born into royalty.

Kūhiō was often called Ke Ali‘i Maka‘āinana (Prince of the People) and is well known for his efforts to preserve and strengthen the Hawaiian people.

Early life and family 

Kalanianaʻole was born March 26, 1871 in Kukui‘ula, Kōloa on the island of Kauaʻi. Like many aliʻi (Hawaiian nobility) his genealogy was complex, but he was an heir of Kaumualiʻi, the last ruling chief of Kauaʻi. He was named after his maternal grandfather Kūhiō Kalanianaʻole, a High Chief of Hilo, and his paternal grandfather Jonah Piʻikoi, a High Chief of Kauaʻi. His Hawaiian name Kuhio translated into "Chief who leaned forward as he stood," and "Kalanianaʻole" meant "ambitious Chief," or "Chief who is never satisfied."

Education 
He attended St. Alban's College, now ʻIolani School and Oahu College, now Punahou School, in Honolulu on the island of Oʻahu. In the 1870s, a French school teacher at St. Alban's, commented on how young Jonah Kūhiō Kalanianaʻole's eyes twinkled merrily and how he kept a perpetual smile. "He is so cute, just like the pictures of the little cupid", teacher Pierre Jones said. The nickname, "Prince Cupid", stuck with Prince Kūhiō for the rest of his life.

After completing his basic education he also traveled abroad for further study. His uncle King Kalākaua championed future Hawaiian leaders attaining a broader education with his 1880 Hawaiian Youths Abroad program. The Hawaiian government sent Kūhiō and his two brothers Kawānanakoa and Keliʻiahonui to attend Saint Matthew's School in the United States in 1885. Keliʻiahonui died in 1887 while at home from school.

In 1890, Kūhiō and Kawānanakoa were sent to attend schools in the United Kingdom. This came a year after their cousin Kaʻiulani was also sent to England for school He studied at the Royal Agricultural College in England before graduating from a business school in England. He was described as being an excellent marksman and athlete at sports such as football and bicycling.

Pioneer surfing in the United States and Europe 
While attending school in San Mateo, Kūhiō and his brothers would travel south to the Pacific seashore at Santa Cruz. The brothers demonstrated the Hawaiian sport of board surfing to the locals, becoming the first California surfers in 1885. In September 1890, Kawānanakoa and Kūhiō became the first surfers in the British Isles and taught their English tutor John Wrightson to surf on the beaches of Bridlington in northern England.

Prince of the Kalākaua dynasty 

After the rule of the House of Kamehameha ended with the death of King Kamehameha V in 1872, and King Lunalilo died in 1874, the House of Kalākaua ascended to the throne of the Kingdom of Hawaiʻi. He became an orphan after his father died in 1878 and mother in 1884.
Kalanianaʻole was adopted by King David Kalākaua's wife, Queen Kapiʻolani, who was his maternal aunt. This practice was called hānai, a traditional form of adoption widely used in ancient Hawaii, which made Kalanianaʻole a Prince of the Kingdom, with the style of "Royal Highness". After Kalākaua's death in 1891, Liliʻuokalani became queen, and she continued to favour Kalanianaʻole.

Kalanianaʻole worked in a minor position within the Department of the Interior and Custom Office. 

However, in 1893 the overthrow of the Kingdom of Hawaii put in power first a Provisional Government of Hawaii, and then a republic with no role for monarchs. Liliʻuokalani continued to hope she could be restored to the throne, while American businessmen lobbied for annexation.

Post-overthrow activities 

At the age of twenty-four, he participated in the 1895 Wilcox rebellion against the Republic of Hawaiʻi. The rebels proved no match for the Republic troops and police, and shortly after hostilities began, all those involved in the rebellion were routed and captured. Kūhiō was sentenced to a year in prison while others were charged with treason and sentenced with execution. Death sentences were commuted to imprisonment. Kūhiō served his full term. Daily visits of his fiancée, Elizabeth Kahanu Kalanianaʻole encouraged him in his darkest times.

In 1898, the United States annexed Hawaii and the Territory of Hawaii was formed in 1900. His cousin Princess Kaʻiulani and his aunt Queen Dowager Kapiʻolani, who left her properties to Kūhiō and his brother, died in 1899. In responses to these personal losses, Kūhiō and his wife left Hawaii from March 1900 to September 1901 and traveled widely in the United States and Europe, where they were treated as visiting royalty. He also traveled to South Africa where he either enlisted in the British Army or accompanied the army as an observer in the Second Boer War.

From prince to statesman 

Kūhiō eventually returned from his self-imposed exile to take part in politics in post-annexation Hawaiʻi. He became active in the Home Rule Party of Hawaii, which represented native Hawaiians and continued to fight for Hawaiian independence.

On July 10, 1902, Prince Kūhiō split from the Home Rule Party, walking out of its convention along with nearly half of the delegates there. He formed the short-lived Hui Kuokoa Party. However, by September 1, 1902, Kuhio decided to join the Republican Party, was nominated as their candidate for Congress, and dramatically altered the political landscape. Kūhiō was elected delegate to the U.S. Congress as a Republican.

Kūhiō's letter circulated to Senators in 1920 is descriptive of his thinking. "After extensive investigation and survey on the part of various organizations organized for the purpose of rehabilitating the race, it was found that the only method in which to rehabilitate the race was to place them back upon the soil."

He served from March 4, 1903 until his death, winning a total of ten elections. During this time he instituted local government at the county level, creating the county system still used today in Hawaiʻi. He staffed the civil service positions that resulted with Hawaiian appointees. This move combined the political patronage system of 19th century American politics with the traditional Hawaiian chiefly role of beneficently delegating authority to trusted retainers.

In 1903, Kūhiō reorganized the Royal Order of Kamehameha I, which held the first observance of the Kamehameha Day holiday in 1904. He was a founder of the first Hawaiian Civic Club on December 7, 1918.
He helped organize a centenary celebration of the death of Kamehameha I in 1919.

In 1919, Kūhiō introduced in Congress the first-ever Hawaii Statehood Act. It would be another 40 years before seeing fruition.

Women's suffrage in Hawaii 
In 1915, political parties in the territory asked Kūhiō to bring a bill to the U.S. Congress which requested the right for the territorial legislature to rule on women's suffrage. The Organic Act which established the Territory of Hawaii and specifically forbid the territorial legislature from granting suffrage on the local level contrary to the federal constitution. However, Kūhiō received no attention from Congress on the matter, but still brought the issue forward again in 1916. In 1917 Kūhiō brought another bill to the United States Congress which was put forward by Senator John F. Shaforth. The bill would allow the territory of Hawaii to make their own decisions about suffrage. In 1918 New England suffragist Almira Hollander Pitman, who was married to the son of Hawaiian chiefess Kinoʻoleoliliha, helped successfully advocate for the passage of that bill. Pitman used her own political contacts to help Kūhiō. The bill was passed and signed into law in June 1918.

After the revision to the Organic Act, the Hawaiian legislature debated allowing women's suffrage from 1919 to 1920. The issue became deadlocked due to disagreement between the Hawaii Territorial Senate and the Hawaii Territorial House about whether the bill would take into effect in the primary election of 1919 or 1920 or if there should be a referendum on the issue. Local legislation never passed because the following year Congress passed the Nineteenth Amendment, granting all women in the United States the right to vote.

Passage of the Hawaiian Homes Commission Act of 1921 
During this period, the Hawaiian Homes Commission Act of 1921 was signed by President Warren G. Harding. Despite Kūhiō's wishes, the Act contained high blood-quantum requirements, and leased land instead of granting it fee-simple, creating a perpetual government institution. This act and the others that followed continue to be controversial in contemporary Hawaiian politics, and have been used to justify more recent legislation like the Akaka Bill.
He served on the first Hawaiian Homes Commission starting on September 16, 1921.

Death and funeral
Kūhiō died on January 7, 1922.
His body was interred near his royal family at the Royal Mausoleum known as Mauna ʻAla in Nuʻuanu on the island of Oʻahu. His widow Kahanu used her own funds (later reimbursed by the territorial government) to renovate the chapel at the mausoleum in his honor.

Personal life 
In 1888, Kalākaua sent Kūhiō to Japan where he was a guest of the Japanese government. He had wished that Kūhiō would marry a Japanese princess but this political alliance never materialized.

On January 29, 1894, when Princess Kaʻiulani was nineteen, Liliʻuokalani wrote asking her to consider marrying either Prince David Kawānanakoa, Prince Jonah Kūhiō Kalanianaʻole, or an unnamed Japanese prince (then studying in London). She reminded her, "It is the wish of the people that you should marry one or the other of the Princes, that we may have more [A]liis. There are no other Aliis who they look to except Prince David or his brother, who would be eligible to the throne..." It took five months for Kaʻiulani to respond to Liliʻuokalani's suggestion. In a June 22, 1894, letter Kaʻiulani asserted that she would prefer to marry for love unless it was necessary stating, "I feel it would be wrong if I married a man I did not love."

Kūhiō married Elizabeth Kahanu Kaʻauwai.

Legacy 
Kūhiō is memorialized by streets, beaches and surf breaks, Kuhio Beach Park in Poipu near his birthplace, the Prince Kūhiō Plaza Shopping Center, and the Prince Kuhio Federal Building named in his honor. Prince Kūhiō Day on March 26 is a state holiday that honors Kūhiō's birth. Two of Hawaii's public schools also honor the memory of Prince Jonah Kūhiō Kalanianaʻole: Prince Jonah Kūhiō Elementary School in Honolulu and Prince Jonah Kūhiō Kalanianaʻole Elementary and Intermediate School in Papaikou, Hawaii, near Hilo on the Island of Hawaii.

See also 

List of Asian Americans and Pacific Islands Americans in the United States Congress
List of United States Congress members who died in office (1900–49)

References

Bibliography

Books and journals

Newspapers and online sources

Further reading

External links 

"Prince Jonah Kuhio Kalaniana 'ole" (2001), bronze sculpture, Kuhio Beach Park, Honolulu, HI

Memorial addresses delivered in the House of Representatives in memory of Jonah Kūhiō Kalanianaʻole, late a delegate from Hawaii

Delegates to the United States House of Representatives from the Territory of Hawaii
Republican Party members of the United States House of Representatives from Hawaii
20th-century American politicians
1871 births
1922 deaths
Princes of Hawaii
Punahou School alumni
Alumni of the Royal Agricultural University
British military personnel of the Second Boer War
Royalty of the Hawaiian Kingdom
House of Kalākaua
Prisoners and detainees of the Republic of Hawaii
Native Hawaiian politicians
Hawaii Republicans
Burials at the Royal Mausoleum (Mauna ʻAla)
Hawaiian insurgents and supporters
Home Rule Party of Hawaii politicians
Hawaiian military personnel
Recipients of the Royal Order of Kalākaua
Recipients of the Royal Order of Kapiolani
Hawaiian adoptees (hānai)
ʻIolani School alumni
Native Hawaiian surfers
Asian conservatism in the United States